Van der Byl or Vanderbyl is a surname derived from the Dutch van der Bijl. Notable people with the surname include:

Charles Vanderbyl (1874–1956), English fencer
Michael Vanderbyl (born 1947), American graphic designer
P. K. van der Byl (1923–1999), South African-born Rhodesian politician
Philip Vanderbyl (1827–1892), British politician
Pieter Voltelyn Graham van der Byl (1889–1975), South African soldier and politician

See also
Van der Bijl

Afrikaans-language surnames
Surnames of Dutch origin